Steven Barnett may refer to:

 Steve Barnett (American football) (1941–2018), American football offensive lineman
 Steven Barnett (water polo) (born 1943), American Olympic water polo player
 Steven Barnett (diver) (born 1979), Australian Olympic diver
 Steve Barnett (music executive) (born 1952), American record-company executive
 Steve Barnett (politician), Secretary of State of South Dakota

See also
 Stephen Barnett (1935–2009), American law professor and legal scholar
 Stephen Barrett (born 1933), American psychiatrist, webmaster of Quackwatch